Cytilus is a genus of pill beetles in the family Byrrhidae. There are about eight described species in Cytilus.

Species
These eight species belong to the genus Cytilus:
 Cytilus alternatus (Say, 1825)
 Cytilus auricomus (Duftschmid, 1825)
 Cytilus kanoi Takizawa & Nakane, 1977
 Cytilus longulus Casey
 Cytilus mimicus Casey, 1912
 Cytilus nigrans Casey
 Cytilus sericeus (Forster, 1771)
 Cytilus tartarinus Scudder, 1900

References

Further reading

External links

 

Byrrhidae
Articles created by Qbugbot